The  was a defensive stone wall, 20 kilometres (12 mi) long, constructed along Hakata Bay in Japan in preparation for an attack by Mongol forces of the Yuan dynasty after the first attack of 1274.

The second attack of 1281 was thwarted by a typhoon, or kamikaze, and the Mongols were forced to withdraw. In the Edo period, some of the stones were reused for the construction of Fukuoka Castle, though Genkō Bōrui has remained intact at several points along the Hakata Bay. It was originally called . It was designated a national historic site on March 30, 1931.

History
The Mongol invasions  of Japan in 1274 and 1281 were major military efforts undertaken by Kublai Khan to conquer Japan.  After the failure of the first invasion, the Kamakura shogunate initiated a series of projects in 1275 to prepare for the next invasion, which they felt was imminent.

In addition to improving the organization of the samurai of Kyushu, they ordered the construction of a large stone wall and other defensive structures at many potential landing points, including Hakata Bay. Construction began in March 1276. The planned date of completion for most of the wall was August of the same year, but the deadline differed depending on the strategic importance of given locations. Construction of the defense wall was made by various Kyushu provinces. These provinces continued maintenance on the wall until the early part of the Muromachi period, and by the latter half of the 14th century it had fallen into disrepair.

A part of Genkō Bōrui was completed before the second invasion and prevented the enemy from landing immediately. The invaders were forced to anchor their ships at Shikanoshima Island.  The battles occurred over several months between several thousand evenly-matched combatants. Takezaki Suenaga of Higo Province joined the battles and had artists draw scrolls concerning the Battle of Kōan. This second attack of 1281 was finally thwarted by a typhoon, or kamikaze, and the Mongols were forced to withdraw.

Even later, the defense system was continued, and remained intact until 1332. In the Edo period, most of the stones were used for the construction of Fukuoka Castle.  It was designated a national historic site on March 30, 1931.

Taxation and transformation
At first, battle-ready soldiers were excluded from taxation, but this policy was soon discontinued and each province in Kyushu was taxed.  The tax was usually one sun (3.3 cm) of the wall's length per 1 tan of rice field; the weapons were one shield, one flag and 20 arrows per 1 jo (3.314 yards) of stone wall. The tax was in the form of men who constructed the wall and in the form of the items (weapons), but later the tax was paid in money; 114 mon per one cho of rice field was typical. The taxation continued to the early part of the Muromachi Bakufu.

Structure
It was packed with small stones inside, the seaside steep and the landside less steep. Shields and flags were placed on the Genko Borui and stakes were planted in the sea at irregular intervals.

Etymology
In articles of the Fukuoka Nichi Nichi Shimbun ("Fukuoka Daily Newspaper") between June 12 and June 29, 1913, Heijiro Nakayama first used the words Genkō Bōrui to mean "Mongolian Invasion defense structure" and he contrasted the Genkō Bōrui from conventional stone defense by its high elevation and its design as a sand dike covered with stones; a structure which would effectively block an invasion attempt.

Archaeological excavations
The Genkō Bōrui was excavated at the locations listed below.  All locations were along Hakata Bay, within the city of Fukuoka.

In 1958, human bones corresponding to 200 bodies were found in Imazu near the defensive structure, with ceramics considered to have been used by those convened for the construction of the wall.

Notes

External links

 
 
 
 
 

 Comprehensive Database of Archaeological Site Reports in Japan, Nara National Research Institute for Cultural Properties

Fukuoka Prefecture
History of Fukuoka Prefecture
National Treasures of Japan